Trần Thị Kim Hồng (born 26 January 1985) is a Vietnamese footballer who plays as a midfielder.

International goals

External links 
 

1985 births
Living people
Women's association football midfielders
Vietnamese women's footballers
Vietnam women's international footballers
Asian Games competitors for Vietnam
Footballers at the 2006 Asian Games
Footballers at the 2010 Asian Games
Southeast Asian Games silver medalists for Vietnam
Southeast Asian Games medalists in football
Competitors at the 2007 Southeast Asian Games
Competitors at the 2013 Southeast Asian Games
21st-century Vietnamese women